Thérèse Cadorette (1925 – 2007) was a Québécois writer and actress. A square in Montreal, Quebec, was renamed  to honour her in 2016, as part of the Toponym'elles initiative.

Career 
Thérèse Cadorette began her career in theatre with the Compagnons de Saint-Laurent. She later pursued a career in television and was cast in roles for La famille Plouffe and Les Belles Histoires des pays d'en haut.

Square Thérèse-Cadorette 
On November 25, 2016, a local square was officially renamed Square Thérèse-Cadorette as part of Montreal's efforts to improve the representation of women in public spaces.

References 

1925 births
2007 deaths